The 1997 Recopa Sudamericana was the ninth Recopa Sudamericana, an annual football match between the winners of the previous season's Copa Libertadores and Supercopa Sudamericana competitions.

The match was contested between River Plate, winners of the 1996 Copa Libertadores, and Vélez Sársfield, winners of the 1996 Supercopa Sudamericana, on April 13, 1997. After a 1–1 draw, Vélez Sársfield managed to beat River Plate 4–2 on penalty shootout to win the trophy. Renowned goalkeeper José Luis Chilavert became the first ever goalkeeper to score a goal in the competition.

Qualified teams

Match details

References

Rec
Recopa Sudamericana
R
R
R
1997
R